Miranda Miller (born 23 September 1950) is an English novelist who has also published short stories and a book of interviews with homeless women and politicians.

Biography
She was born in London, the daughter of Alan Hyman and the youngest of four children (including the artist Timothy Hyman and Afghan scholar Anthony Hyman). She was educated at St Christopher's School, Hampstead, Queen's College, London and PNEU School, Queen's Gardens before starting a History degree at King's College London. After a year she moved to Rome where she wrote her first novel. She has also lived in Libya, Saudi Arabia and Japan.

From 1979-1999 she was married to the artist and teacher Dr Michael Miller and has one daughter, Rebecca, born in 1981. She is now married to the musician Gordon St John Clarke and they live in North London.

List of works
 Under the Rainbow: Hutchinson, 1978 (published under the name Miranda Hyman)
 Family: Hutchinson, 1979
 Before Natasha: Love Stories, 1985
 Smiles and the Millennium: Virago, 1987
 A Thousand and One Coffee Mornings: Scenes from Saudi Arabia: Peter Owen, 1989
 Bed and Breakfast: Women and Homelessness Today, The Women's Press, 1990
 Loving Mephistopheles: Peter Owen, 2007
 Nina in Utopia, Part 1 of The Bedlam Trilogy: Peter Owen, 2010
 The Fairy Visions of Richard Dadd, Part 2 of The Bedlam Trilogy: Peter Owen, 2013
 Angelica, Paintress of Minds: 2020, Barbican Press

Awards
 1989 K Blundell Award from the Society of Authors
 2013-15 Royal Literary Fund Fellowship at the Courtauld Institute

References

External links 
 Official website

1950 births
Living people
People educated at Queen's College, London
Alumni of King's College London
British writers